Galletas de patatas (lit. "potato crackers"), commonly sold as egg cracklets, are Filipino biscuits. They are characteristically thick and square-shaped with upturned edges. The name is derived from the curving browned lower edge which resembles a potato. It is also called galletas de huevos ("egg crackers") due to the use of egg-white glazing, or tengang daga ("mouse ears") due to its shape.

See also
Galletas del Carmen
Galletas pesquera
Roscas

References 

Philippine pastries
Biscuits